Antakaspidini is a tribe of armored scale insects.

Genera
Antakaspis

References

Hemiptera tribes
Diaspidinae